Chersonesos or Chersonesus was an ancient city of Sicily, Italy.  It was one of the oldest Greek colonies in Sicily, being founded in 717 or 716 BCE.  (Jerome, ap. Eusebius, Chronikon, 157).  Its precise location is not now known, but it is near Syracuse (Ptol. 3. 94. 4).

References
M. Miller, The Sicilian Colony Dates, (1970), p. 15, 22

Colonies of Magna Graecia
Populated places established in the 8th century BC
Lost ancient cities and towns
Ancient cities in Sicily
Former populated places in Italy